Honganur  is a village in the southern state of Karnataka, India. It is located in the Chamarajanagar taluk of Chamarajanagar District in Karnataka.

Demographics
 India census, Honganur had a population of 7043 with 3482 males and 3561 females.

See also
 Bangalore Rural
 Districts of Karnataka

References

External links
 http://Bangalorerural.nic.in/

Villages in Bangalore Rural district